Ricardo Manuel Arias Espinosa (5 April 191215 March 1993) was the 29th President of Panama.

Born in Washington, D.C. from a prominent Panamanian political family, Arias studied at universities in the United States, Colombia and Chile. He became Second Vice President of Panama in 1952, and served as president from March 29, 1955 to October 1, 1956. He belonged to the National Patriotic Coalition (CNP).

He was President of the National Assembly from 1956 to 1957. He later served as the Panamanian Ambassador to the United States during the 1960s and in the Board of Directors of numerous companies in Panama.  He died in 1993 in Panama City.

His son, Ricardo Alberto Arias, has been minister of foreign affairs and the Panamanian ambassador to the United Nations.

References

1912 births
1993 deaths
Politicians from Washington, D.C.
Presidents of Panama
Vice presidents of Panama
Walsh School of Foreign Service alumni
Government ministers of Panama
Permanent Representatives of Panama to the United Nations
Ambassadors of Panama to the United States
Presidents of the National Assembly (Panama)
Panamanian expatriates in the United States
Panamanian expatriates in Chile
Panamanian expatriates in Colombia